Puffer Pond is a lake located southwest of Christian Hill, New York. Fish species present in the lake are brook trout, and black bullhead. Access by trail from Thirteenth Lake. No motors are allowed on this lake.

References

Lakes of New York (state)
Lakes of Warren County, New York